Champions League 2008–09 may refer to:

UEFA Champions League 2008–09
CONCACAF Champions League 2008–09
OFC Champions League 2008–09